Lake Maurepas is located in southeastern Louisiana, approximately halfway between New Orleans and Baton Rouge, directly west of Lake Pontchartrain.

Toponymy 
Lake Maurepas was named for Jean-Frédéric Phélypeaux, comte de Maurepas, an eighteenth-century French statesman, chief adviser to King Louis XVI.
Jean-Frédéric was the son of Louis Phélypeaux, comte de Pontchartrain, for whom Lake Pontchartrain is named.

Characteristics 
Lake Maurepas is a round-shaped, shallow, brackish tidal estuarine system. It is approximately 240 km2. in area and has a mean depth of about 3.0 meters. The lake receives freshwater input through four river systems: Blind River, Amite River, Tickfaw River, and the Natalbany River. The average freshwater input to Lake Maurepas from these rivers and other minor terrestrial sources is less than 3,400 cubic feet per second (CWPPRA Environmental Workgroup, 2001). 
At the northeast, Lake Maurepas is connected to Lake Pontchartrain by Pass Manchac (comprising South Pass and the smaller North Pass). The land between these two passes forms Jones Island, and the passes converge on the eastern side of the island into one unified Pass Manchac. Tidal exchange with Lake Pontchartrain through Pass Manchac is a more significant influence on Lake Maurepas’s volumetric and elevation characteristics than tributary freshwater discharge. The Manchac Swamp Bridge, which carries Interstate 55, traverses this area between Lakes Maurepas and Pontchartrain.
The mean astronomical tide in Lake Maurepas is approximately 0.15 m (0.5 ft); however, greater tidal amplitudes are associated with meteorological events (i.e., winds) that influence both Lake Pontchartrain and Lake Maurepas. This results in interesting patterns of tidal exchange and, presumably, in situ mixing on weekly and fortnightly time scales. The lake’s salinity is directly influenced by exchange with Lake Pontchartrain. 
Salinities in Lake Maurepas have been observed to range between 0 and 3 parts per thousand (Day et al., 2004). Typically, salinities are higher along the eastern shore, near Pass Manchac. Due to Lake Maurepas’s shallow depths, even relatively low energy wave action results in sediment resuspension and, therefore, relatively high turbidities and low transparencies, which influence the degree to which primary production can occur in the water column and benthos.

Maurepas Swamp WMA 
The Maurepas Swamp Wildlife Management Area (WMA) is located approximately 25 miles northwest of New Orleans, along the south shore as well as south of Lake Maurepas. The area is north of LaPlace and extends towards Sorrento. Initially the Richard King Mellon Foundation donated 61,633 acres to the Louisiana Department of Wildlife and Fisheries (LDWF) for the Maurepas Swamp WMA. Subsequent acquisitions and donations brought the total to 122,098 acres. The swamp would benefit from "cooperative freshwater reintroduction projects designed to revive the swamp, and improved control of invasive plant species that have overtaken much of this important and scenic swamp."

See also 
 Manchac, Louisiana
 Maurepas, France

References 

Bodies of water of Livingston Parish, Louisiana
Bodies of water of St. John the Baptist Parish, Louisiana
Bodies of water of Tangipahoa Parish, Louisiana
Maurepas
Tributaries of Lake Pontchartrain